Eidmannella pallida is a species of true spider in the family Nesticidae. It is found in North America, has been introduced into Pacific Islands, Galapagos Islands, Macaronesia, Spain, and Japan.

References

External links

 

Nesticidae
Articles created by Qbugbot
Spiders described in 1875